The Medicine Hat Charity Classic is an annual bonspiel on the men's and women's World Curling Tour. It is held every October at the Medicine Hat Curling Club in Medicine Hat, Alberta.

Event names
Medicine Hat Super 8 Motel Charity Classic (1997)
Medicine Hat Super 8 Charity Classic (1998–2001)
Jackson Dodge Charity Classic (2002)
Meyers Norris Penny Charity Classic (2003–2012)

Past champions

Men

Women

References

External links
 

Sport in Medicine Hat
World Curling Tour events
Women's World Curling Tour events
Curling in Alberta